Military history records three Operation Eisbär, all conducted by the Germans in 1943. The name means Polar bear in German. 

They were:
 German evacuation of the French island of Corsica on 3 October 1943.
 The German amphibious and airborne landings on the British and Italian-held Greek island of Kos on 3 October.
 An anti-partisan operation conducted in January 1943 in the area between Bryansk and Dmitriyev-Lgovsky, Russia.
 12 June 1944 initiation of German V-1 flying bomb missile attacks on London.

Reference

Anti-partisan operations of World War II
Military operations of World War II involving Germany